Heteroponera panamensis is a species of ant in the genus Heteroponera. Endemic to Costa Rica and Panama, It was described by Forel in 1899.

References

External links

Heteroponerinae
Hymenoptera of South America
Insects described in 1899